The Open the Freedom Gate Championship was the major title in the promotion Dragon Gate USA. The first holder of the title was crowned following a 14-man tournament held at DGUSA Freedom Fight on November 28, 2009. The title was recognized by Dragon Gate USA's parent promotion, Dragon Gate, and it has been defended at a Dragon Gate show in Japan. The title was also recognized by the Evolve promotion.

There were seven reigns by six wrestlers. BxB Hulk became the first champion by winning a 14-man tournament. Timothy Thatcher was the final champion, vacating the title on August 15, 2015.

The championship was defended in the USA, Japan, China, England, Germany, Canada, Scotland and Northern Ireland  for promotions such as Revolution Pro Wrestling, British Championship Wrestling, Outback Championship Wrestling, Dragon Gate, Fight Club: PRO, Southside Wrestling Entertainment, Alpha-1 Wrestling, WWNLive, Kamikaze Pro, Premier British Wrestling and Pro Wrestling Ulster.

Title history

Combined reigns

See also
Open the Dream Gate Championship

References

External links
Open The Freedom Gate Championship

Dragon Gate USA championships
Evolve (professional wrestling) championships